Border Cafe may refer to:
Border Cafe (film), a 1937 film
Border Cafe (TV series), a British TV series
Café Transit a 2005 film directed by Kambuzia Partoviaka, also known as Border Café